Highwood is a village and civil parish in the Chelmsford district of Essex, England. The village is approximately a mile south from the A414 road and four miles west from the centre of the county town of Chelmsford. Loves Green is part of the village at its north. The hamlet of Edney Common is at the east of the parish. In 2011 the parish had a population of 654.

History 
The parish was formed on 1 April 1954 from the parish of Writtle.

References 

Villages in Essex
Civil parishes in Essex
City of Chelmsford